Campolide is a freguesia (civil parish) and district of Lisbon, the capital of Portugal. Located in central Lisbon, Campolide is west of Avenidas Novas, north of Campo de Ourique, east of Benfica, and south of São Domingos de Benfica. The population in 2011 was 15,460,

History

Campolide was the site of a major battle on 5 September 1833, when the forces of Dom Miguel attacked those of Dom Pedro, as Pedro attempted to wrest back control of Portugal from his brother.

Campolide was made a freguesia of Lisbon on February 7, 1959.

On 7 August 2008, two Brazilian robbers robbed a Banco Espírito Santo branch kidnapping six hostages, including the bank manager. This hostage hijacking ended with the intervention of the special forces of Portuguese police.

Population

Landmarks
Águas Livres Aqueduct
Palácio da Justiça
Central Mosque of Lisbon
NOVA University Lisbon

References

External links

Parishes of Lisbon